Ola By Rise (born 14 November 1960 in Trondheim) is a Norwegian football coach and former player. He played 18 seasons and 346 matches in the Norwegian top division.

Career
In his career as an active player, he was the goalkeeper of Rosenborg BK in Trondheim. From 1977 to 1995 he played 346 matches for Rosenborg in the Norwegian top league, which was a national record at the time he retired and until By Rise was surpassed by former teammate Roar Strand. As of January 2013, By Rise ranks 5th in this respect. He was capped 25 times for the Norwegian national team, and was in the Norwegian squad for the 1994 World Cup. He was also a member of the Norwegian team competing at the 1984 Summer Olympics in Los Angeles, California.

By Rise was the assistant coach of Rosenborg under the head coaches Trond Sollied (1998), Nils Arne Eggen (1999–2002) and Åge Hareide (2003). When Hareide quit in Rosenborg to become head coach of the Norwegian national team, By Rise became the head coach of Rosenborg in the 2004 season. Going into the 2004 season, Rosenborg had won twelve consecutive league titles. However, despite winning for a 13th consecutive season in 2004, the club had a relatively poor season by its high domestic standards, as it finished level on points and goal difference with Vålerenga, winning the title on goals scored. By Rise was sacked November 2004 by the club and worked for NRK radio station P1 as managing editor from 1 February 2005. On 18 July 2006, he was assigned as the new assistant coach for the Norwegian national team. In April 2014 he signed a contract for the final 4 games to try Danish team Aarhus Gymnastikforening avoid relegation.

He has also had a professional career outside football as a journalist for Adresseavisen, the local newspaper in Trondheim.

Career statistics

Honours

Player
Rosenborg
Norwegian top division (7): 1985, 1988, 1990, 1992, 1993, 1994, 1995
Norwegian Football Cup (4): 1988, 1990, 1992, 1995

Coach
Norwegian top division (6): 1998, 1999, 2000, 2001, 2002, 2003 (as assistant coach)
Norwegian Football Cup (2): 1999, 2003 (as assistant coach)
Norwegian top division: 2004 (as head coach/manager)

Individual
Kniksen award as goalkeeper of the year: 1992
Kniksen's honour award: 1995

References

1960 births
Living people
Kniksen Award winners
Norwegian footballers
Norway international footballers
Norwegian journalists
Olympic footballers of Norway
Footballers at the 1984 Summer Olympics
Norwegian football managers
Rosenborg BK managers
Ranheim Fotball managers
Rosenborg BK players
Eliteserien players
Norwegian First Division players
Association football goalkeepers
1994 FIFA World Cup players
Footballers from Trondheim